George Lessey (June 8, 1879 – June 3, 1947) was an American actor and director of the silent era. He appeared in more than 120 films between 1910 and 1946. He also directed more than 70 films between 1913 and 1922. 

Lessey was born in Amherst, Massachusetts, and as a boy he acted in theatrical productions there. He graduated from Amherst College.

For a year, Lessey was a leading man for Edison Studios, after which he directed films for the company for two years. In 1914, he joined Universal Studios as a director. He portrayed Romeo in the initial film version of Romeo and Juliet, directed the first serial, What Happened to Mary, and played the first dual role in film as twins in The Corsican Brothers. 

On stage, Lessey appeared in the original Broadway production of Porgy and Bess (1935) in one of the few white roles, that of the lawyer Mr. Archdale. 

In the 1930s, Lessey worked as a model for men's clothes. 

Lessey was married to the former May Abbey. On June 3, 1947, Lessey died on vacation in Westbrook, Connecticut, aged 67.

Selected filmography

 A Fresh Air Romance (1912, Short) - Young Doctor Fogg
 A Soldier's Duty (1912, Short) - Commanding General
 The Twelfth Juror (1913, Short)
 Graft (1915, Serial)
 The Purple Lady (1916, director)
 Patria (1917, Serial)
 The Eagle's Eye (1918, director)
 To Him That Hath (1918) - Henry Allen
 Twilight (1919) - Dr. Henry Charmant
 The $1,000,000 Reward (1920, director) - James Bradley
 The Harvest Moon (1920) - Jacques Vavin
 Wits vs. Wits (1920) - James Marsley
 A Divorce of Convenience (1921) - Senator Wakefield
 Is Life Worth Living? (1921) - Lawyer
 Why Girls Leave Home (1921) - Mr. Hedder
 Handcuffs or Kisses (1921) - Elias Pratt
 Rainbow (1921) - Rufus Halliday
 School Days (1921) - His Guardian - the Deacon
 The Snitching Hour (1922) - Larry
 The Silent Command (1923) - Mr. Collins
 It Is the Law (1924) - Inspector Dolan
 Scar Hanan (1925) - Bart Hutchins
 The Fool (1925) - Goodkind
 White Thunder (1925) - Sheriff Richards
 Durand of the Bad Lands (1925) - John Boyd
 Annapolis Salute (1937) - Captain Brooks (uncredited)
 ...One Third of a Nation... (1939) - Doctor (uncredited)
 Birthright (1939)
 Dr. Kildare's Strange Case (1940) - Rufus Ingersoll
 Edison, the Man (1940) - Toastmaster
 Andy Hardy Meets Debutante (1940) - Underwood
 Sporting Blood (1940) - Banker Cobb
 The Golden Fleecing (1940) - Buckley Sloan
 Boom Town (1940) - Judge
 Strike Up the Band (1940) - Mr. Morgan
 Sky Murder (1940) - Senator Monrose
 Dulcy (1940) - Judge Paroling Henry to Dulcy (uncredited)
 Hullabaloo (1940) - Mr. Arthur Jay Norton
 Gallant Sons (1940) - Judge
 Go West (1940) - Railroad President
 Blonde Inspiration (1941) - C. V. Hutchins
 Forbidden Passage (1941, Short) - American Consul in Lisbon
 Men of Boys Town (1941) - Bradford Stone
 The Big Boss (1941) - Senator Williams
 Adventure in Washington (1941) - Vice-President (uncredited)
 Moon Over Miami (1941) - William Boulton
 Sweetheart of the Campus (1941) - Dr. Hale
 Blossoms in the Dust (1941) - Mr. Keats
 We Go Fast (1941) - J.P. Hempstead
 It Started with Eve (1941) - Johnson - Hotel Guest (uncredited)
 You Belong to Me (1941) - Marshall (uncredited)
 Born to Sing (1942) - Mr. Lawson (uncredited)
 Roxie Hart (1942) - Judge Cannon
 Rings on Her Fingers (1942) - Fenwick Sr.
 The Postman Didn't Ring (1942) - Governor Marvin Winthrop (uncredited)
 The Pride of the Yankees (1942) - Mayor of New Rochelle
 The Gay Sisters (1942) - Judge Barrows
 Girl Trouble (1942) - Morgan
 Now, Voyager (1942) - Uncle Herbert (uncredited)
 Laugh Your Blues Away (1942) - Mr. Westerly
 The Crystal Ball (1943) - Judge (uncredited)
 Dixie Dugan (1943) - Sen. Patterson
 Mission to Moscow (1943) - Bill - Well-wisher (uncredited)
 Someone to Remember (1943) - College Trustee (uncredited)
 Pistol Packin' Mama (1943) - Mr. Burton
 What a Woman! (1943) - Senator Hendricks (uncredited)
 Henry Aldrich, Boy Scout (1944) - Commissioner Towers (uncredited)
 None Shall Escape (1944) - Presiding Judge
 Charlie Chan in the Secret Service (1944) - Slade (uncredited)
 Cover Girl (1944) - Minister (uncredited)
 Buffalo Bill (1944) - Mr. Schyler Vandervere
 The Adventures of Mark Twain (1944) - Henry H. Rogers (uncredited)
 Roger Touhy, Gangster (1944) - Judge (uncredited)
 Bride by Mistake (1944) - Business Man (uncredited)
 Wilson (1944) - Senator (uncredited)
 Sweet and Low-Down (1944) - Norman Wilson (uncredited)
 Eadie Was a Lady (1945) - Rev. Ames (uncredited)
 One More Tomorrow (1946) - Men's Club Member (uncredited)
 The Missing Lady (1946) - James Douglas (uncredited)

References

External links

George Lessey portraits at New York Public Library, Billy Rose Collection

1879 births
1947 deaths
American male film actors
American male silent film actors
People from Amherst, Massachusetts
20th-century American male actors
Film directors from Massachusetts
Amherst College alumni